This is a list of Czech language exonyms for towns located in Austria.

See also
List of Czech exonyms for places in Germany
Czech exonyms
List of European exonyms

Czech
Czech language
Czech exonyms for places in Austria